Nueve de Julio is a department of the province of Río Negro (Argentina).

Municipalities 

 Comicó
 Cona Niyeu
 Ministro Ramos Mexía
 Prahuaniyeu
 Treneta
 Sierra Colorada
 Yaminué

References 

Departments of Río Negro Province